Riley D. Cote (born March 16, 1982) is a former Canadian professional ice hockey left winger and formerly an assistant coach with the Lehigh Valley Phantoms of the American Hockey League (AHL). He played eight National Hockey League (NHL) seasons with the Philadelphia Flyers and was mainly known as an enforcer. He currently co-hosts the Nasty Knuckles podcast.

Career

Playing career
Undrafted after completing juniors, Cote was a walk-on to the Toronto Maple Leafs training camp in the fall of 2002. He impressed the Leafs' staff, signed a one-year contract, and was assigned to the Leafs Central Hockey League affiliate, the Memphis RiverKings. While called up to the St. John's Maple Leafs, Toronto's American Hockey League affiliate, a few times during the 2002–03 season, he spent most of his rookie year with the RiverKings and was with them when they won the CHL championship that season.

Not re-signed by the Leafs, Cote was signed to a two-way contract by the Syracuse Crunch of the AHL and entered the training camp for their NHL affiliate, the Columbus Blue Jackets, in fall 2003. Columbus released him and he returned to the Crunch. An eye injury caused during a pre-season scrimmage resulted in Cote being assigned to the Crunch's ECHL affiliate, the Dayton Bombers, for much of the 2003–04 season. Cote was recruited back to the RiverKings for the 2004–05 season but was offered a try-out contract by the AHL's Philadelphia Phantoms just before the season began. The Phantoms extended his contract twice through the season and Cote eventually spent the entire season with Philadelphia, accumulating a team-leading 280 penalty minutes in the process, and helped the Phantoms win the Calder Cup as league champions. Shortly after the season ended, the Phantoms signed him to a one-year contract.

After participating in the Philadelphia Flyers training camps in the fall of 2005 and 2006, Cote was signed to a two-way contract by the Flyers in 2006–07. Early in the season, he was assigned to the Phantoms and shortly after suffered an ankle injury that kept him from playing for two months. Late in the season, Cote played in his first 8 NHL games with the Flyers, making his NHL debut on March 24, 2007, against the New York Islanders. Cote was recognized for his contributions to the community when the Phantoms named him as the team's 2006–07 Man of the Year. Cote was re-signed by the Flyers to a one-year contract for the 2007–08 season and made the team out of training camp.

Cote was suspended for three games after he delivered a high headshot to Dallas Stars defenceman Matt Niskanen late in the third period on December 1, 2007. He became the fifth Flyers player to receive a suspension during the 2007–08 season after Steve Downie, Jesse Boulerice, Randy Jones and Scott Hartnell.

Cote scored his only NHL goal on February 17, 2008, against rookie goaltender Carey Price of the Montreal Canadiens. On July 2, 2008, the Flyers announced they had signed Cote to a three-year contract extension.

After appearing in only 15 games during the  season, Cote retired on August 9, 2010, and was named an assistant coach of the Adirondack Phantoms.

Cote played a game for the Danbury Hat Tricks of the Federal Prospects Hockey League on November 28, 2021.

Coaching
Cote was an assistant coach for the Lehigh Valley Phantoms from 2010 to 2017. The Phantoms play in the American Hockey League and serve as the top-level minor league affiliate of the Philadelphia Flyers.

Broadcasting
Cote currently co-hosts the Nasty Knuckles podcast along with former Flyers' head equipment manager Derek "Nasty" Settlemyre.

Cannabis and hemp advocacy

During his time in the NHL, Cote used cannabis as a natural pain reliever and alternative to addictive pharmaceutical drugs.  After retiring, Cote co-founded Athletes for Care, a group that advocates for athletes on issues of health and safety including the use of cannabis as medicine.

Cote is also an advocate for hemp, founding the Hemp Heals Foundation to educate the public about the nutritional benefits of hemp and its numerous eco-friendly industrial uses.  The organization hosts an annual music festival in Philadelphia to raise awareness about the various benefits and applications of the hemp plant.  Cote is also a board member of the Pennsylvania Hemp Industry Council.

Cote is co-founder of a company called Bodychek Wellness, which produces organically grown CBD extracts and functional mushroom blends intended as alternatives to traditional pain medications.

Personal life
Cote is married to wife Ashley and has two daughters named Kinsley and Kaia. He became an advocate for multiple sclerosis diagnosis and treatment after his older sister, Jamie, was diagnosed with the disease in 2000. His nickname is Riles.

Aside from hockey, Cote has also been involved in real estate, creative production, and mindfulness coaching.

Awards
 2002–03: Ray Miron President's Cup Memphis RiverKings
 2004–05: Calder Cup Philadelphia Phantoms
 2006–07: Man of the Year, Philadelphia Phantoms
 2007–08: Pelle Lindbergh Memorial, Philadelphia Flyers

Career statistics

References

External links
 

1982 births
Living people
Canadian ice hockey left wingers
Dayton Bombers players
Ice hockey people from Winnipeg
Memphis RiverKings players
Philadelphia Flyers players
Philadelphia Phantoms players
Prince Albert Raiders players
St. John's Maple Leafs players
Syracuse Crunch players
Undrafted National Hockey League players
American cannabis activists